Bharosa (Trust) is a 1940 Hindi/Urdu social melodrama film produced and directed by Sohrab Modi. Made under the Minerva Movietone banner, the story and lyrics were by Lalchand Bismil, with cinematography by Y. D. Sarpotdar. The music was composed by G. P. Kapoor, and the cast included Chandra Mohan, Sardar Akhtar, Mazhar Khan, Sheela, Maya Devi and Eruch Tarapore.

The film revolves around an incestuous relationship that develops unwittingly between a brother and sister. The theme was "considered to be quite revolutionary" with a "daring" "thematic climax".

Plot
Gyan (Mazhar Khan) and Rasik (Chandra Mohan) are good friends and when Gyan has to go to Africa for work, he leaves his wife Shobha (Sardar Akhtar) in care of Rasik and his wife Rambha (Maya Devi). Rasik has always liked Shobha but kept silent about it. Rambha goes to her parents' home, leaving Rasik and Shobha alone in the house. Rasik gives in to his feelings with Shobha being a willing participant. Soon Shobha gives birth to a daughter (Indira) whom Gyan believes to be his child. Rasik and Shobha are shocked when Gyan decides on an alliance between Indira and Rasik's son Madan seeing the close relationship they share.

Cast
 Chandra Mohan as Rasik
 Sardar Akhtar as Roshan
 Mazhar Khan as Gyan
 Sheela as Indira
 Maya Devi
 Naval as Madan
 Eruch Tarapore
 Gulab
 Menaka
 Abu Bakar
 Ram Apte

Review
The Filmindia editor, Baburao Patel, not known to have an amiable relationship with Modi, normally panned his films. However, for Bharosa, as cited by Amrit Gangar in his book, Patel's review carried the headline "Sohrab Modi Directs His First Good Picture" going to the extent of claiming that Bharosa was a better picture than Modi's Pukar.

Soundtrack
The music director was G. P. Kapoor with lyrics by Lalchand Bismil. The singers were Khan Mastana, Menka, Sheela, Paresh Bannerji and Sardar Akhtar.

Song List

References

External links

1940 films
1940s Hindi-language films
1940 drama films
Indian drama films
Films directed by Sohrab Modi
Indian black-and-white films
Melodrama films
Hindi-language drama films